Quitoriano is a surname. Notable people with the surname include:

Raymundo Quitoriano (born 1933), Filipino sports shooter
Teagan Quitoriano (born 2000), American football player

Surnames of Philippine origin
Surnames of Filipino origin